Romica Rașovan (born 22 December 1967) is a Romanian wrestler. He competed in the men's freestyle 48 kg at the 1992 Summer Olympics.

References

1967 births
Living people
Romanian male sport wrestlers
Olympic wrestlers of Romania
Wrestlers at the 1992 Summer Olympics
Sportspeople from Reșița